

Simpson Desert is a locality in the Australian state of South Australia located about  north of the capital city of Adelaide and which is located within the desert of the same name.

The locality was established on 26 April 2013 in respect to “the long established local name” which is derived from the desert of the same name.

The principal land use within the locality is conservation , with the full extent of the locality being occupied by the Munga-Thirri–Simpson Desert National Park, which was proclaimed on 26 November 2021 and includes the former protected areas  of the Munga-Thirri–Simpson Desert Conservation Park and the Munga-Thirri–Simpson Desert Regional Reserve.

Simpson Desert is located within the federal division of Grey, the state electoral district of Stuart, the Pastoral Unincorporated Area of South Australia and the state’s Far North region.

References

Towns in South Australia
Far North (South Australia)
Places in the unincorporated areas of South Australia